Daes may refer to: 

 Daes (Δάης), ancient Greek historian from Kolonai
 Erica-Irene Daes (1925–2017), academic, diplomat and United Nations expert
 DAEs, Differential-algebraic system of equations